Rado Krošelj (born 1915, date of death unknown) was a Slovene illustrator and graphic designer who won the Levstik Award in 1952 for his illustrations of the book of poems for children  Barčica (The Little Boat) selected and translated by Alojz Gradnik. He was also the author of numerous political and other posters in the period immediately after the Second World War.

Selected illustrated works
 Kavkaške pravljice (Tales from the Caucasus), written based on traditional tales by France Bevk, 1954
 Barčica (The Little Boat), children's poems selected and translated by Alojz Gradnik, 1952
 Liščki (Goldfinches), written by Tone Seliškar, 1950
 Pregnancy (Exiles), written by Adam Milkovič, 1948

References

1915 births
Year of death missing
Levstik Award laureates
Slovenian illustrators